Jennings-Baker House is a historic home located at Reidsville, Rockingham County, North Carolina. It was built about 1888, and is a two-story, three bay, solid masonry dwelling with vernacular Gothic and Italianate style design elements. It has symmetrical two-story, five-sided projecting bays and two-tier hip roofed porch on the front facade.

Jennings-Baker House was listed on the National Register of Historic Places in 1987.

References

Houses on the National Register of Historic Places in North Carolina
Gothic Revival architecture in North Carolina
Italianate architecture in North Carolina
Houses completed in 1888
Houses in Rockingham County, North Carolina
National Register of Historic Places in Rockingham County, North Carolina